The  is an electric multiple unit (EMU) train type operated by the private railway operator Kobe Electric Railway (Shintetsu) in Japan since 2008.

Design
It was the first new type ordered by the company in 14 years and also the first type with stainless steel bodies. The 18 m long cars have three pairs of doors per side and longitudinal bench seating throughout.

Formation
, the fleet consisted of two four-car sets formed as follows.

The Mc1 and M1 cars each have one single-arm pantograph.

Interior

History
The first set, 6001, was delivered in 2008, and entered revenue-earning service on 4 June 2008.

See also
 Shintetsu 6500 series, 3-car sets based on the 6000 series design

References

External links

 Kobe Electric Railway press release 

Electric multiple units of Japan
Transport in Kobe
Train-related introductions in 2008
Kawasaki multiple units
1500 V DC multiple units of Japan